Davoud Yaqoubi (December 17, 1982) is an Afghan footballer who last played for SC Concordia Hamburg.

National team statistics

External links
 

Afghan footballers
Afghanistan international footballers
Afghan expatriate footballers
1982 births
Living people
Association football forwards